Stuart is a surname which was also adopted as a given name, traditionally for men. It is the French form of the Scottish surname Stewart. The French form of the name was brought to Scotland from France by Mary Stuart, in the 16th century.

The surname Stewart is an occupational name for the administrative official of an estate. The name is derived from the Middle English , and Old English , .

In England prior to the Norman Conquest, a steward was an officer who controlled the domestic affairs of a household, especially of a royal household. After the Conquest, the term was used as an equivalent of Seneschal, a steward of a manor or estate.

A variant form of the given name is Stewart. Pet forms of the given name are Stu, Stew and Stewie.

Surname
Alexander Hugh Holmes Stuart (1807–1891), American politician 
Alexander Moody Stuart (1809–1898), minister of the Free Church of Scotland (1843–1900)
Andrea Stuart (born 1962), Barbadian-British writer
Angus Stuart, British rugby union player
Barbara Stuart (1929/1930–2011), American actress
Bob Stuart (1920–2005), New Zealand international rugby union player, captain and coach
Brad Stuart (born 1979), Canadian hockey player
Catherine Maxwell Stuart, 21st Lady of Traquair (born 1964), Scottish landowner and businesswoman
Chad Stuart (1941–2020), stage name of David Stuart Chadwick, English folk-pop singer and guitarist, one half of the duo Chad & Jeremy
Charles Stuart, several people
Christina Doreothea Stuart, Norwegian artist
Colin Stuart (disambiguation), several people
David Stuart, several people
Dick Stuart, a/k/a "Dr. Strangeglove" (1932–2002), American Major League Baseball player
Douglas Stuart (writer) (born 1976), Scottish-American writer 
Francis Stuart (1902–2000), Irish writer and Saoi of Aosdána
Gilbert Stuart (1755–1828), American painter
Gisela Stuart (born 1955), German-born British politician
Gloria Stuart (1910–2010), American actress
Herbert Akroyd Stuart (1864–1927), English engineer
 Ian Stuart (bishop), Australian bishop
 Ian Stuart (cricketer), South African cricketer
 Ian Stuart (designer), British designer
 Barbara H. Stuart, Australian chemist
 Ian Stuart Donaldson (1957–1993), British musician 
Imogen Stuart, (born 1927), sculptor and member of Aosdána
J. E. B. Stuart (1833–1864), Confederate general in the American Civil War
James "Athenian" Stuart (1713–1788), English archaeologist, architect and artist
Jamie Stuart (born 1976), English footballer
Jesse Stuart (1906–1984), American writer
Jill Stuart (born 1965), American fashion designer
John McDouall Stuart (1815–1866), Scottish-Australian explorer
John Stuart (disambiguation), several people
Mark Stuart (disambiguation), several people
Mary Stuart (disambiguation), several people
Maurine Stuart, Zen teacher
Michael Stuart (disambiguation), several people
Moira Stuart (born 1949), British presenter and broadcaster
Nick Stuart (1904–1973), Austro-Hungarian-born American actor and bandleader
Nik Stuart (1927–2002), British Olympic gymnast
Otho Stuart (1863–1930), British actor 
Peter Stuart, American songwriter and musician
Phil Stuart, Irish Gaelic footballer
Randy Stuart, American actress
Ricky Stuart, Australian rugby league player and coach

Given name
Stuart Adamson (1958–2001), English-born Scottish guitarist, vocalist, and songwriter, co-founder and frontman of the rock band Big Country
Stuart Alexander Bennett (born 1980), English professional wrestler under the ring name Wade Barrett
Stuart Ashen (born 1976), English comedian, animator, actor and author 
Stuart R. Bell, American academic, President of the University of Alabama
Stuart Bingham (born 1976), English professional snooker player, 2015 World Champion
Stuart Broad (born 1986), English cricketer
Stuart Cable (1970–2010), British drummer
Stuart Chatwood (born 1969), English-born Canadian rock musician
Stuart Clark (born 1975), Australian cricketer
Stu Cook (born 1945) American musician, original bassist of Creedence Clearwater Revival
Stuart Davis (painter) (1892–1964), American painter
Stuart Douglas (born 1978), English footballer
Stu Douglass (born 1990), American-Israeli basketball player for the Israeli team Maccabi Ashdod
Stuart Fairchild (born 1996), Taiwanese-American baseball player
Stuart Feldman, UNIX pioneer, creator of Make
Stuart Fraser (disambiguation)
Stu Gardner, American musician and composer
Stuart Garner (born 1968), British businessman
Stuart Goddard (born 1956), English musician and actor known as Adam Ant
Stuart Gray (basketball) (born 1963), basketball player
Stuart Gray (footballer, born 1960), former footballer for Barnsley and Aston Villa, and football manager
Stuart Gray (footballer, born 1973), former footballer for Reading and Celtic
Stuart Gray (musician) (born 1961), Australian musician and composer
Stuart Green (born 1981), English footballer
Stuart Hall (cultural theorist) (1932–2014), Jamaican-born British sociologist and political activist 
Stuart "Captain Calamity" Hill (born 1943), English pensioner
Stuart Krohn (born 1962), American professional rugby union player
Stu Laird (born 1960), former Canadian Football League player
Stuart MacGill (born 1971), former Australian cricketer
Stuart Maconie (born 1961), English radio DJ
Stuart McDonald (cartoonist) (born 1931), editorial cartoonist
Stuart Mitchell (born 1965), Scottish painter
Stuart Mitchell (American football) (born 1964), American football player
Stuart Morris, Australian lawyer and former justice of the Supreme Court of Victoria
Stuart Nisbet (1934–2016), American character actor
Stuart Parnaby (born 1982), English footballer
Stuart Pearce (born 1962), English footballer and manager
Stu Pederson (born 1960), Major League baseball player
Stuart Rendell (born 1972), Australian hammer thrower
Stuart Richardson (born 1977), bassist for Lostprophets
Stuart Scott (1965–2015), American sportscaster
Stuart Sternberg (born 1959), American owner of the Tampa Bay Rays
Stuart Subotnick (born 1942), American businessman and media magnate
Stuart Sutcliffe (1940–1962), British artist and original bassist of The Beatles
Stuart Thurgood (born 1981), English footballer
Stuart Townsend (born 1972), Irish actor and director
Stuart Wells (born 1982), English actor
Stuart Wheeler (1935–2020), American businessman and politician
Stuart Zender (born 1974), original bass player from Jamiroquai

Fictional characters
Stuart "2-D" Pot, vocalist and pianist of the virtual band Gorillaz
Stuart Bloom, comic store owner in The Big Bang Theory
Stuart Bondek, Deputy Mayor in the sitcom Spin City
Stuart Caley, a character in the 1998 American science-fiction disaster movie Deep Impact
Stuart Chandler, a character on All My Children played by David Canary
Stuart Kennedy-Hand, bestowed upon Kristine Janet Pamela Mullins to serve as her loyal Viking Ninja Warrior, Protector of Kristine and all 9 Cats of the most high.
Stuart Little, the main character of the E. B. White novel of the same name later turned into three successful films
Stu Macher, a main character in the original Scream franchise. 
Stuart McCormick, a recurring character in South Park and the father of Kenny McCormick
Stu Pickles, a recurring character in the Rugrats media and the father of Tommy Pickles
Stu Price, recurring character from The Hangover series
Stu Redman, one of the main characters from Stephen King's The Stand
Stuart Smalley, a recurring character played by Al Franken on the sketch comedy show Saturday Night Live
Stuart, a minion from the Despicable Me franchise
Stuart, Princess Caroline's assistant in Netflix original series BoJack Horseman
Disco Stu, a recurring character in The Simpsons
the protagonist of Percy Stuart, a German TV series (1969-1972)
Stuart, Peter Sam's original name in The Railway Series and Thomas and Friends.

See also
House of Stuart, former royal house of Scotland, then the United Kingdom
Stu
Stuart (disambiguation)
Stewart (disambiguation)
Stewart (name), people with the surname and given name
Stuart House (disambiguation)

References

English-language surnames
French-language surnames
Scottish masculine given names
English masculine given names
Given names originating from a surname